The Nissan Stagea is a station wagon produced by Nissan from 1996 to 2007. It was originally produced by Nissan in 1996 as direct competition for the Subaru Legacy Touring wagon in Japan, and was exclusive to Nissan Prince Store Japanese dealerships. The Stagea shares many mechanical parts with the Nissan Skyline and Nissan Laurel.

There are 4 different versions of the Stagea: the WC34 Series 1 (September 1996 to July 1997), the WC34 Series 1.5 (August 1997 to July 1998), the WC34 Series 2 (August 1998 to March 2001), and the M35 Series (2001 to 2007).



First generation (WC34; 1996)

Series 1
The WC34 Series 1 was produced from 1996 to July 1997. This model bears many visual similarities to the R34 Nissan Skyline, giving the impression of lineage to the R34 Nissan Skyline, though mechanically it is most similar to the R33 Nissan Skyline.

The WC34 Stagea was available with a 2.0L single-cam inline-six engine, a 2.5L twin-cam naturally-aspirated inline-six, a 2.5L twin-cam turbocharged inline-six, or a 2.6L twin-cam twin-turbocharged inline-six engine. All engines were from the Nissan RB engine family, with the 2.6L (260RS model) being the same as that equipped in the R33 Skyline GTR.

The Stagea was available in rear wheel drive (RWD) and all-wheel drive (AWD) variants, with the RWD variants using RWD Laurel front suspension of the strut type and AWD versions using RWD R34 Skyline front suspension of the multi-link type. Both RWD and AWD shared its chassis platform with the C35 Laurel, which had the same wheelbase of 2720mm, and was also available in RWD and AWD. 

There were some differences in the chassis between 2WD and AWD model Stageas.  The main difference being that the driver's side chassis rail on the AWD version was positioned closer to the lower sill. This was done to make room for the transfer case located on the end of the AWD transmission.

The AWD system, ATTESA E-TS, is identical in operation to the Nissan Skyline GTS-FOUR and GT-R AWD system. The AWD Stageas fitted with an automatic transmission also featured a transfer case lock; this locked the transfer case in full 4WD and bypassed the ABS, g-force sensor inputs and ATTESA E-TS engine control unit which were all normally required for the AWD system to work.

Unlike the Skyline and Laurel which had 5 speed automatic transmissions on some automatic 2.5L non turbo versions, all automatic Stageas were 4 speed. All manual models were 5 speed although only 2 models were available manual, the Series 2 turbo RS4S and the Series 1.5 & Series 2 Autech Version 260RS, which were exclusively manual.

Paint Options
Series 1 paint options:
 KR4 Sonic Silver 
 BP9 Dark blue pearl 
 DS0 Emerald green 
 DR2 Dark Emerald green  
 AR1 Super clear red II 
 WK1 Silky Snow Pearl

Note - There are a very small number of Series 1 Stageas produced in non-standard paint codes.
 KJ6 Dark Bluish Black Pearl (1)
 KN6 Dark Grey Pearl (5)
 KN4 Yellow Bluish Silver (2)
 KT2 Bluish Silver (1)

Series 1.5
In August 1997, the Stagea received minor changes to the model lineup, lasting until July 1998. The main reason for the change was the replacement of the RB25DE and RB20E engines (found in X and G models) with the updated RB25DE NEO and RB20DE NEO engines.  Series 1.5 also added several new model configurations to the lineup:
 25t X Four - X/G trim interior with RB25DET engine
 25RS - RS trim interior with RB25DE NEO engine and RWD configuration
 Aero Limited - Factory installed Dayz aero bumper, side skirts, rear skirt, and wing. This option was only available in AR1, KR4 and WK1 paint codes.
 Autech Version 260RS - see below

In November 1997, two more models were added to the series 1.5 lineup:
 20X - X/G trim interior with RB20DE NEO engine
 25RS Four - RS trim interior with RB25DE NEO engine and 4WD configuration

Paint options
Series 1.5 paint options:
 KR4 Sonic Silver 
 BP9 Dark blue pearl 
 DS0 Emerald green 
 DR2 Dark Emerald green  
 AR1 Super clear red II 
 WK1 Silky Snow Pearl
 5S5 Silky Snow Pearl over Sonic Silver
 KJ6 Dark Bluish Black Pearl (260RS only, although Nissan Database shows one RS Four V produced in this paint code as well)

260RS Autech version 
The Stagea 260RS Autech Version, or just 260RS, is a tuned version of the Stagea made by Japanese tuning company Autech. The 260RS uses the 2.6L RB26DETT coupled to a 5-speed manual transmission and features ATTESA E-TS all-wheel drive from the R33 GTR and a limited-slip rear differential. Other modifications include Brembo brakes, 17" BBS forged alloy wheels, body strengthening, an undercarriage protector, upgraded suspension, a front strut brace, a special rear stabilizer, Autech badging and an Autech bodykit that includes unique sideskirts, front bumper and tailgate spoiler. Interior modifications include an R33 GTR steering wheel, GTR style gauges, a leather shift knob and parking brake handle and special seat trim. Like other Japanese sports cars of the time, the 260RS officially produced  but most sources believe the actual horsepower to be higher. 1,734 260RS (series 1.5 and series 2) models were produced from November 1997 to March 2001.

Series 2

The WC34 series 2 (August 1998 to March 2001) was a minor revision of the WC34 Series 1. The headlights were changed in shape and made from high impact plastic (previous model had glass headlights) and the high beam lights moved into the grill. The indicators were changed to a clear unit, and changed shape slightly. Front aero was slightly revised and body mouldings colour matched. Interior trim choices were also changed. It has the same engine choices, but they are the updated NEO version of the RB series and higher spec models included a tiptronic auto transmission. A choice of transmissions is also available: 4-speed auto (E-AT) for X and G series models, 4-speed tiptronic auto (M-AT) found in RS series models, and 5-speed manual for the 25t RS FOUR S and 260RS.

New models and options for Series 2 included:
 25t RS V - RS interior trim with RB25DET NEO in RWD configuration
 25t RS Four S - RS interior trim with RB25DET NEO, 4WD, and 5-speed manual transmission
 Type B Option for the two models above - a minimally equipped version with steel wheels meant for the customer to modify to their taste
 1999 and up Prime Edition Option - Available on all 25RS and 25t RS model Stageas.  Included premium leather and wood grain appointed interior  
 2000 and up Navi Edition Option - Available on all 20RS and 25RS model Stageas.  Included an 8-inch LCD Multi-AV system in the center console with updated Navigation system.

Paint options
Series 2 paint options:
 KR4 Sonic Silver 
 BP9 Dark blue pearl 
 EV1 Lightning Yellow
 DR2 Dark Emerald green  
 AR2 Active Red
 QT1 Pearl White
 5T3 Pearl White over Sonic Silver
 TV2 Bayside Blue (model year 2000/2001 only)

Models by production date/series

Specs
 Frame: E-WGC34 (2WD); E-WGNC34 (4WD)
 Exterior dimensions (LxWxH):  x  x 
 Interior dimensions (LxWxH):  x  x 
 Wheel base: 
 Treads (F/R):  / 
 Ground clearance: 
 Kerb vehicle weight:

Second generation (M35; 2001) 

The M35 series (2001 to 2007) looks very different from the previous C34 models and is derived from the Skyline/G35 sedan (V35 platform). As per the Skyline the engine was changed from the RB series straight-six to the VQ series V6 engine.

Series 1
From October 2001 to August 2004, the following range of models were available:
 250RS/RS V/RX: VQ25DD engine - V6 2.5L NA, direct injection, rear-wheel drive
 250RS FOUR/RX FOUR: VQ25DD engine - V6 2.5L NA, direct injection, four-wheel drive
 250tRS FOUR V/RX FOUR: VQ25DET engine - V6 2.5L single turbo, four-wheel drive
 300RX: VQ30DD engine - V6 3.0L NA, direct injection, rear-wheel drive.
 350S: VQ35DE engine - V6 3.5L NA, Autech Axis Model, rear-wheel drive

The Autech Axis 350S was the only M35 chassis Stagea to ever be offered with a manual transmission and was produced from June 2003 to July 2004

There were a couple of sub-variants:
 250tRS FOUR V HICAS: A 250tRS FOUR V with the addition of the Nissan HICAS four-wheel steering system
 AR-X FOUR: A 250t FOUR (i.e. 2,5L turbo/4wd) model with increased ride height and SUV-like body ornaments. 
 There were 4 'aero selection' models added in 2002 to the 250RS/250tRS FOUR/250tRS FOUR V/250tRS FOUR V HICAS ranges, this added a bodykit to the standard car.

Series 2

In August 2004, the range was modified:
 250RX: VQ25DD engine - V6 2.5L NA, direct injection, rear-wheel drive
 250RX FOUR: VQ25DD engine - V6 2.5L NA, direct injection, four-wheel drive
 350RX: VQ35DE engine - V6 3.5L NA, rear-wheel drive
 350RX FOUR: VQ35DE engine - V6 3.5L NA, four-wheel drive
 AR-X FOUR: VQ35DE engine - V6 3.5L NA, four-wheel drive

End of life
Nissan ceased production of the Stagea in early June 2007, Nissan Japan stated that it would continue to sell the remaining stock of the vehicle but that production of the vehicle had ended. The model segment served by this vehicle was replaced by the Nissan Skyline Crossover.

References

Stagea
Station wagons
2000s cars
Cars introduced in 1996
Rear-wheel-drive vehicles
All-wheel-drive vehicles
Vehicles with four-wheel steering